is a 1940 Japanese drama film directed by Hiroshi Shimizu. It is based on the novel of the same name by Bunroku Shishi.

Plot
Young teacher Nobuko starts her new job in a girls' school in Tokyo, residing at the place of her aunt Okei, a geisha instructor. Not only is she admonished by the school principal for her heavy rural accent, but also for living in a geisha house which is regarded irreconcilable with the school's reputation. As a consequence, Nobuko moves into the school's dormitory as one of the boarding masters.

Nobuko becomes the repeated target of pranks by rebellious pupil Eiko, and learns that neither the principals nor the teachers take measures against her, as her father is an important financier of the institute. She eventually gains respect and popularity among the students, but Eiko retains her disrespectful attitude. After repeated misbehavings, Nobuko exerts a collective punishment of the pupils, which leads to Eiko's social isolation and suicide attempt. While watching over her at her sickbed, Nobuko learns from Eiko that her behaviour was only a means of getting attention and affection which she didn't find at home. The schoolboard considers Nobuko's dismissal to appease Eiko's father, but is instead urged by him to keep Nobuko and treat his daughter like the other girls.

Cast
 Mieko Takamine as Nobuko Komiyama
 Mitsuko Miura as Eiko Hosokawa
 Chōko Iida as Okei, Nobuko's aunt
 Fumiko Okamura as Mrs. Sekiguchi, school principal
 Masami Morikawa as Mrs. Hosaka, vice principal
 Eiko Takamatsu as Fusako Yoshioka, teacher
 Setsuko Shinobu as Yasuko Tezuka, teacher
 Misao Matsubara as Mrs. Matsubara, teacher
 Sachiko Mitani as Chako, a geisha apprentice
 Mitsuko Yoshikawa as Eiko's stepmother
 Shin'yō Nara as Mr. Hosokawa, Eiko's father
 Shin'ichi Himori as Burglar

Legacy
Nobuko was released by Shochiku in 2008 as part of a Hiroshi Shimizu DVD box set, also containing his films Children in the Wind, Introspection Tower and Four Seasons of Children, and as a single DVD in 2013. A screening of the film was provided by the Cinémathèque française in 2020 and 2021.

Shishi's novel was again adapted for Japanese television in later years, including versions in 1957, 1964 and 1965.

References

External links
 

1940 films
1940 drama films
Japanese drama films
Japanese black-and-white films
Films based on Japanese novels
Films directed by Hiroshi Shimizu